Stephanie Veronica McLean  is a Canadian lawyer and former politician who was elected in the 2015 Alberta general election to the Legislative Assembly of Alberta representing the electoral district of Calgary-Varsity. She is a graduate of the University of Calgary's law school and was sworn in as the Minister of Status of Women and Minister of Service Alberta on February 2, 2016.

Political career
McLean made history when she became the first Member of the Legislative Assembly of Alberta and first Minister in Alberta's history to give birth while in office. McLean gave birth to a baby boy, Patrick, on February 12, 2016. McLean's pregnancy sparked questions around the logistics and rules of the Alberta legislature around pregnancy, maternity leave, and support for new parents in the legislature. Her pregnancy spurred the creation of an all-party committee with a mandate to review and make recommendations on maternity leave and making the Legislature more responsive to members' family obligations. When asked why she thought it took until 2015 for the Alberta Legislature to have a pregnant MLA, McLean replied that for the first time in Alberta's history an unprecedented number of women had been elected; "It’s just a matter of it being a typical old boys’ club. When you look down from the galleries at the House, our half of the House has substantially more women than in the past. It took Alberta some time to change and we had a substantial change in government."

Electoral history

2015 general election

2014 Calgary-Elbow by-election

References

1987 births
Alberta New Democratic Party MLAs
Women government ministers of Canada
Living people
Lawyers in Alberta
Members of the Executive Council of Alberta
Politicians from Calgary
Women MLAs in Alberta
University of Calgary Faculty of Law alumni
University of Calgary alumni
21st-century Canadian politicians
21st-century Canadian women politicians